Wild is a survival game that is being developed by Wild Sheep Studio and to be published by Sony Interactive Entertainment. The game was announced in 2014 and had infrequent updates during development, with the game eventually being rumored to be cancelled after game director Michel Ancel retired from the game industry in 2020.

Gameplay
Wild is set during the prehistoric Neolithic period in a procedurally generated world. Within the game world, the player controls a human and can use smaller animals to spy on others, or larger animals to support the player and their tribe in fights with other humans. Animals can be controlled by using shamanic powers - once "possessing" an animal the gameplay moves to the point of view of the controlled creature, and then proceeds using the skills and characteristics of that animal.

Development

2014-2020: Announcement 
Wild began development in 2014 at Wild Sheep Studio, a developer based in Montpellier founded by Michel Ancel from Ubisoft. Initial plans for the game included a very large, continent-sized open world, dynamic weather complete with seasonal variations, online play, and the ability to play as any wild creature in the world, including wolves, sheep, fish, ants, cats, birds, etc. A gameplay trailer for the game was shown at Gamescom in August 2014 and then at Paris Games Week in October 2015, where the developers released a new gameplay trailer and a film about the production of the game.

Due to the lack of updates during development, many journalists considered the game to be vaporware.

2020: Ancel's departure 
In September 2020, Ancel announced his retirement from the gaming industry but added that development on the game would continue without him.

References

External links

Vaporware video games
Action-adventure games
Cancelled PlayStation 4 games
Open-world video games
Prehistoric people in popular culture
Sony Interactive Entertainment games
Survival video games
Video games developed in France
Multiplayer and single-player video games
Video games about animals
Video games about witchcraft
Video games set in prehistory
Video games using procedural generation
Video games directed by Michel Ancel